Dangol Boré  is a rural commune of the Cercle of Douentza in the Mopti Region of Mali. The commune contains 34 villages and in the 2009 census had a population of 27,165. The principal village (chef-lieu) is  Boré.

References

External links
.
.

Communes of Mopti Region